Claysville is an unincorporated, rural community in Harrison County, Kentucky, United States; which was established by African Americans after the American Civil War ended in 1865. It is located on U.S. Route 62 at the Licking River.

History
The area was originally called "Marysville", and was laid out in 1799 or 1800. A post office called Marysville was established in 1816. 

The post office was renamed Claysville in 1825, and remained in operation until it was discontinued in 1917. Claysville was once considered a busy shipping point, but when the railroad was completed in the area and bypassed Claysville, business activity shifted to other nearby towns, and Claysville's population dwindled.

References

Unincorporated communities in Harrison County, Kentucky
Unincorporated communities in Kentucky
Populated places in Kentucky established by African Americans